Tim Velten (born September 1, 1983 in St. Louis, Missouri) is an American soccer player, last playing for AC St. Louis in the USSF Division 2 Professional League.

Career

College
Velten attended Webster Groves High School where he was a second team All State soccer player as a senior. He played two years of college soccer at Southern Illinois University Edwardsville, where he started all 39 games of his freshman and sophomore seasons and was named the Great Lakes Valley Conference Co-Freshman of the Year in 2001, and a First Team All-Conference, First Team All-Region, and Third Team All-American his sophomore year
before transferring to the University of Louisville as a junior. At Louisville he started 34 games over the course of 2004 and 2005, and was named Co-Most Valuable Player and Defensive Most Valuable Player by his teammates in 2004.

Professional
Velten turned professional in 2007 when he joined the Harrisburg City Islanders in the USL Second Division, and was part of the USL-2 championship-winning team in his debut season. On July 16, 2007, the Baltimore Blast of Major Indoor Soccer League selected Velten in the 8th round of the MISL Supplemental Draft, but he did not sign with the team.

On April 8, 2008, Velten signed with the Charleston Battery in the USL First Division., and played 26 games for the Battery before returning to Harrisburg in 2009. On February 9, 2010, he signed with the new founded club AC St. Louis.

References

External links
AC St. Louis bio
Harrisburg City Islanders bio
Charleston Battery bio
SIU Edwardsville bio
University of Louisville bio

Living people
1983 births
American soccer players
Penn FC players
Charleston Battery players
Rochester New York FC players
AC St. Louis players
Louisville Cardinals men's soccer players
SIU Edwardsville Cougars men's soccer players
USL Second Division players
USL First Division players
USSF Division 2 Professional League players
Webster Groves High School alumni
Soccer players from Missouri
Association football defenders